Monteforte d'Alpone is a comune (municipality) in the Province of Verona in the Italian region Veneto, located about  west of Venice and about  east of Verona.

Monteforte d'Alpone borders the following municipalities: Gambellara, Montecchia di Crosara, San Bonifacio, and Soave. The economy is based on the production of wine.

Main sights
Church (Oratory) of St. Anthony (13th century)
Church of the Capuchins  (14th century)
Church of Santa Croce (14th century)
Bishops Palace (15th century), built by bishop of Venice Ermolao Barbaro on design by Michele da Caravaggio. It has a chapel with a fresco by Francesco Torbido (1534)
Palazzo Durlo-Montanari (15th century)

References

External links
 www.montefortedalpone.org/
 www.prolocomonteforte.org/

Cities and towns in Veneto